The history of Soviet Russia and the Soviet Union (USSR) reflects a period of change for both Russia and the world. Though the terms "Soviet Russia" and "Soviet Union" often are synonymous in everyday speech (either acknowledging the dominance of Russia over the Soviet Union or referring to Russia during the era of the Soviet Union), when referring to the foundations of the Soviet Union, "Soviet Russia" often specifically refers to brief period between the October Revolution of 1917 and the creation of the Soviet Union in 1922.

Before 1922, there were four independent Soviet Republics: the Russian Soviet Federative Socialist Republic, Ukrainian Soviet Socialist Republic, Byelorussian SSR, and Transcaucasian SFSR. These four became the first Union Republics of the Soviet Union, and was later joined by the Bukharan People's Soviet Republic and Khorezm People's Soviet Republic in 1924. During and immediately after World War II, various Soviet Republics annexed portions of countries in Eastern Europe, and the Russian SFSR annexed the Tuvan People's Republic, and from the Empire of Japan took South Sakhalin and the Kuril Islands. The USSR also annexed three countries on the Baltic Sea wholesale, creating the Lithuanian SSR, Latvian SSR, and Estonian SSR. Over time, national delimitation in the Soviet Union resulted in the creation of several new Union-level Republics along ethnic lines, as well as organization of autonomous ethnic regions within Russia.

The USSR gained and lost influence with other Communist countries over time. The occupying Soviet army facilitated the establishment of post-WWII Communist satellite states in Central and Eastern Europe. These were organized into the Warsaw Pact, and included the People's Socialist Republic of Albania, People's Republic of Bulgaria, Czechoslovak Socialist Republic, East Germany, Hungarian People's Republic, Polish People's Republic, and Socialist Republic of Romania. The 1960s saw the Soviet–Albanian split, Sino-Soviet split, and de-satellization of Communist Romania; the 1968 Warsaw Pact invasion of Czechoslovakia fractured the communist movement. The Revolutions of 1989 ended Communist rule in satellite countries.

Tensions with the central government led to constituent republics declaring independence starting in 1988, leading to the complete dissolution of the Soviet Union by 1991.

1917–1927: Establishment 

The original philosophy of the state was primarily based on the works of Karl Marx and Friedrich Engels. In its essence, Marx's theory stated that economic and political systems went through an inevitable evolution in form, by which the current capitalist system would be replaced by a Socialist state before achieving international cooperation and peace in a "Workers' Paradise," creating a system directed by, what Marx called "pure communism".

Displeased by the relatively few changes made by the Tsar after the Russian Revolution of 1905, Russia became a hotbed of anarchism, socialism and other radical political systems. The dominant socialist party, the Russian Social Democratic Labour Party (RSDLP), subscribed to Marxist ideology. Starting in 1903 a series of splits in the party between two main leaders was escalating: the Bolsheviks (meaning "majority") led by Vladimir Lenin, and the Mensheviks (meaning minority) led by Julius Martov. Up until 1912, both groups continued to stay united under the name "RSDLP," but significant differences between Lenin and Martov thought split the party for its final time. Not only did these groups fight with each other, but also had common enemies, notably, those trying to bring the Tsar back to power. Following the February Revolution of 1917, the Russian Provisional Government, established by liberal, conservative, and socialist politicians, shared power with the Petrograd Soviet, which was controlled by the Mensheviks and Socialist Revolutionaries. This regime of “dual power” lasted only a few months until the Bolsheviks took power in the October Revolution, also known as the Great October Socialist Revolution.

Under the control of the party, all politics and attitudes that were not strictly RCP (Russian Communist Party) were suppressed, under the premise that the RCP represented the proletariat and all activities contrary to the party's beliefs were "counterrevolutionary" or "anti-socialist." During the years of 1917 to 1924, the Soviet Union achieved peace with the Central Powers, their enemies in World War I, but also fought the Russian Civil War against the White Army and foreign armies from the United States, United Kingdom, and France, among others. This resulted in large territorial changes, albeit temporarily for some of these. Eventually crushing all opponents, the RCP spread Soviet style rule quickly and established itself through all of Russia. Following Lenin's death in 1924, Joseph Stalin, General Secretary of the RCP, became Lenin's successor and continued as leader of the Soviet Union into the 1950s.

1927–1953: Stalinism 

The history of the Soviet Union between 1927 and 1953 covers the period of the Second World War and of  victory against Nazi Germany while the USSR remained under the control of Joseph Stalin. Stalin sought to destroy his political rivals while transforming Soviet society with central planning, in particular a collectivization of agriculture and a development of heavy industry. Stalin's power within the party and the state was established and eventually evolved into Stalin's cult of personality,  Soviet secret-police and the mass-mobilization. The Communist Party was one of Stalin's major tools in molding the Soviet society. Stalin's methods in achieving his goals, which included party purges, political repression of the general population, and forced collectivization, led to millions of deaths: in Gulag labor camps, during the man-made famine, and during forced resettlements of population.

World War II, known as "the Great Patriotic War" in the Soviet Union, devastated much of the USSR with about one out of every three World War II deaths representing a citizen of the Soviet Union. After World War II the Soviet Union's armies occupied Central and Eastern Europe, where socialist governments took power. By 1949 the Cold War had started between the Western Bloc and the Eastern (Soviet) Bloc, with the Warsaw Pact pitched against NATO in Europe. After 1945 Stalin did not directly engage in any wars. Stalin continued his totalitarian rule until his death in 1953.

1953–1964: Khrushchev Thaw 

In the Soviet union, the eleven-year period from the death of Joseph Stalin (1953) to the political ouster of Nikita Khrushchev (1964), the national politics were dominated by the Cold War; the ideological U.S.–USSR struggle for the planetary domination of their respective socio–economic systems, and the defense of hegemonic spheres of influence. Nonetheless, since the mid-1950s, despite the Communist Party of the Soviet Union (CPSU) having disowned Stalinism, the political culture of Stalinism—an omnipotent  General Secretary, anti-Trotskyism, a five-year planned economy (post-New Economic Policy), and repudiation of the Molotov–Ribbentrop Pact secret protocols—remained the character of Soviet society until the accession of Mikhail Gorbachev as leader of the CPSU in 1985.

1964–1982: Era of Stagnation 

The history of the Soviet Union from 1964 to 1982, referred to as the Brezhnev Era, covers the period of Leonid Brezhnev's rule of the Union of Soviet Socialist Republics (USSR). This period began with high economic growth and soaring prosperity, but ended with a much weaker Soviet Union facing social, political, and economic stagnation. The average annual income stagnated, because needed economic reforms were never fully carried out.

Nikita Khrushchev was ousted as First Secretary of the Central Committee of the Communist Party of the Soviet Union (CPSU), as well as Chairman of the Council of Ministers, on 14 October 1964 due to his failed reforms and disregard for Party and Government institutions. Brezhnev replaced Khrushchev as First Secretary and Alexei Kosygin replaced him as Chairman of the Council of Ministers. Anastas Mikoyan, and later Nikolai Podgorny, became Chairmen of the Presidium of the Supreme Soviet. Together with Andrei Kirilenko as organisational secretary, and Mikhail Suslov as chief ideologue, they made up a reinvigorated collective leadership, which contrasted in form with the autocracy that characterized Khrushchev's rule.

The collective leadership first set out to stabilize the Soviet Union and calm Soviet society, a task which they were able to accomplish. In addition, they attempted to speed up economic growth, which had slowed considerably during Khrushchev's last years in power. In 1965 Kosygin initiated several reforms to decentralize the Soviet economy. After initial success in creating economic growth, hard-liners within the Party halted the reforms, fearing that they would weaken the Party's prestige and power. No other radical economic reforms were carried out during the Brezhnev era, and economic growth began to stagnate in the early-to-mid-1970s. By Brezhnev's death in 1982, Soviet economic growth had, according to several historians, nearly come to a standstill.

The stabilization policy brought about after Khrushchev's removal established a ruling gerontocracy, and political corruption became a normal phenomenon. Brezhnev, however, never initiated any large-scale anti-corruption campaigns. Due to the large military buildup of the 1960s the Soviet Union was able to consolidate itself as a superpower during Brezhnev's rule. The era ended with Brezhnev's death on 10 November 1982.

While all modernized economies were rapidly moving to computerization after 1965, the USSR fell further and further behind. Moscow's decision to copy the IBM/360 of 1965 proved a decisive mistake for it locked scientists into a system they were unable to improve so that it gradually became antiquated. They had enormous difficulties in manufacturing the necessary chips reliably and in quantity, in programming workable and efficient programs, in coordinating entirely separate operations, and in providing support to computer users.

One of the greatest strengths of Soviet economy was its vast supplies of oil and gas; world oil prices quadrupled during the 1973–74 oil crisis, and rose again in 1979–1981, making the energy sector the chief driver of the Soviet economy, and was used to cover multiple weaknesses. At one point, Soviet Premier Alexei Kosygin told the head of oil and gas production, "things are bad with bread. Give me 3 million tons [of oil] over the plan."  Former prime minister Yegor Gaidar, an economist looking back three decades, in 2007 wrote:

1982–1991: Reforms and dissolution 

The history of the Soviet Union from 1982 through 1991, spans the period from Leonid Brezhnev's death and funeral until the dissolution of the Soviet Union. Failed attempts at reform, a standstill economy, and the success of the United States against the Soviet Union's forces in the war in Afghanistan led to a general feeling of discontent, especially in the Baltic republics and Eastern Europe.

Greater political and social freedoms, instituted by the last Soviet leader, Mikhail Gorbachev, created an atmosphere of open criticism of the Soviet government. The dramatic drop of the price of oil in 1985 and 1986 profoundly influenced actions of the Soviet leadership.

Nikolai Tikhonov, the Chairman of the Council of Ministers, was succeeded by Nikolai Ryzhkov, and Vasili Kuznetsov, the acting Chairman of the Presidium of the Supreme Soviet, was succeeded by Andrei Gromyko, the former Minister of Foreign Affairs.

Several Soviet Socialist Republics began resisting central control, and increasing democratization led to a weakening of the central government. The USSR's trade gap progressively emptied the coffers of the union, leading to eventual bankruptcy. The Soviet Union finally collapsed in 1991 when Boris Yeltsin seized power in the aftermath of a failed coup that had attempted to topple reform-minded Gorbachev.

Historiography

Bibliography 
 Bibliography of the Russian Revolution and Civil War
 Bibliography of Stalinism and the Soviet Union
 Bibliography of the post-Stalinist Soviet Union
 Bibliography of Ukrainian history
 Historiography in the Soviet Union

Academic journals 
 List of Slavic studies journals

See also 
 Foreign relations of the Soviet Union
 Islam in the Soviet Union
 Index of Soviet Union–related articles
 Ukrainian nationalism

References

Further reading 

 Conquest, Robert. The Great Terror: Stalin's Purge of the Thirties (1973).
 Daly, Jonathan and Leonid Trofimov, eds. "Russia in War and Revolution, 1914–1922: A Documentary History." (Indianapolis and Cambridge, MA: Hackett Publishing Company, 2009). .
 Feis, Herbert. Churchill-Roosevelt-Stalin: The War they waged and the Peace they sought (1953).
  online no charge to borrow
 Fenby, Jonathan. Alliance: the inside story of how Roosevelt, Stalin and Churchill won one war and began another (2015).
 Firestone, Thomas. "Four Sovietologists: A Primer." National Interest No. 14 (Winter 1988/9), pp. 102-107 on the ideas of Zbigniew Brzezinski, Stephen F. Cohen, Jerry F. Hough, and Richard Pipes.
 Fitzpatrick, Sheila. The Russian Revolution. 199 pages. Oxford University Press; (2nd ed. 2001). .
 Fleron, F.J. ed. Soviet Foreign Policy 1917–1991: Classic and Contemporary Issues (1991)
 Gorodetsky, Gabriel, ed. Soviet foreign policy, 1917–1991: a retrospective (Routledge, 2014).
 Haslam, Jonathan. Russia's Cold War: From the October Revolution to the Fall of the Wall (Yale UP, 2011) 512 pages
 Hosking, Geoffrey. History of the Soviet Union (2017).
 Keep, John L.H. Last of the Empires: A History of the Soviet Union, 1945–1991 (Oxford UP, 1995).
 Kotkin, Stephen. Stalin: Vol. 1: Paradoxes of Power, 1878–1928 (2014), 976pp
 Kotkin, Stephen. Stalin: Waiting for Hitler, 1929–1941 (2017) vol 2
 Lincoln, W. Bruce. Passage Through Armageddon: The Russians in War and Revolution, 1914–1918. (New York, 1986). online
 McCauley, Martin. The Soviet Union 1917–1991 (2nd ed. 1993) online
 McCauley, Martin. Origins of the Cold War 1941–1949. (Routledge, 2015).
 McCauley, Martin. Russia, America, and the Cold War, 1949–1991 (1998)
 McCauley, Martin. The Khrushchev Era 1953–1964 (2014).
 Millar, James R. ed. Encyclopedia of Russian History (4 vol, 2004), 1700pp; 1500 articles by experts.
 Nove, Alec. An Economic History of the USSR, 1917–1991. (3rd ed. 1993) online w
 Paxton, John. Encyclopedia of Russian History: From the Christianization of Kiev to the Break-up of the USSR (Abc-Clio Inc, 1993).
 Pipes, Richard. Russia under the Bolshevik regime (1981). online
 Reynolds, David, and Vladimir Pechatnov, eds.  The Kremlin Letters: Stalin's Wartime Correspondence with Churchill and Roosevelt (2019)
 Service, Robert. Stalin: a Biography (2004).
 Shaw, Warren, and David Pryce-Jones. Encyclopedia of the USSR: From 1905 to the Present: Lenin to Gorbachev (Cassell, 1990).
 Shlapentokh, Vladimir. Public and private life of the Soviet people: changing values in post-Stalin Russia (Oxford UP, 1989).
 Taubman, William. Khrushchev: the man and his era (2003).
 Taubman, William. Gorbachev (2017)
 Tucker, Robert C., ed. Stalinism: Essays in Historical Interpretation (Routledge, 2017).
 Westad, Odd Arne. The Cold War: A World History  (2017)
 Wieczynski, Joseph L., and Bruce F. Adams. The modern encyclopedia of Russian, Soviet and Eurasian history (Academic International Press, 2000).

External links 
 An on-line archive of primary source materials on Soviet history

 
Soviet Union